Jean-Marc Volcy (born January 29, 1966) is a Seychellois composer, performer and songwriter regarded as one of the pioneering musicians to propagate creole music in Seychelles. His repertoire of music is a fusion of modern creole pop with traditional folk music. His contributions to music in Seychelles has seen him win numerous awards including the Airtel Music Awards, Les Voix de l'Océan Indien and the Cable Tunes Awards. In February 2017, he was inducted into the Seychelles' Musicians Wall of Fame.

Discography

Albums
 Gou Kreol – (1994)
 Leko Bake – (1997)
 Bel Koud Kannon – (2002)
 Bon Bon – (2005)
 Sove Lavi – (2006)
 Lanmizik i Mazik – (2011)

References

External links

1966 births
Living people
Seychellois male singers
20th-century Seychellois musicians
21st-century Seychellois musicians
People from Baie Lazare
20th-century male singers
21st-century male singers